Joaquín Soriano (born in León, 1941) is a Spanish pianist.

Trained in Valencia, he was a disciple of Vlado Perlemuter at the Conservatoire National de Paris. He won the 1965 Viotti Competition in Vercelli and the XI Premio de Jaén (1966); an international concert career ensued.

Soriano holds a professorship at the Madrid Conservatory since 1972 and is the José Iturbi Competition's artistic director. He is a member of the Real Academia de Bellas Artes de San Fernando since 1988, and has been decorated with the Medalla de Oro al Mérito en las Bellas Artes and the Ordre des Arts et des Lettres.

References
 Joaquín Soriano, en la Academia de Bellas Artes - El País, November 6, 1988
 Boletín Oficial del Estado - January 13, 1998
 Fundación Juan March

Spanish classical pianists
Male classical pianists
1941 births
Living people
Conservatoire de Paris alumni
Academic staff of the Madrid Royal Conservatory
21st-century classical pianists
21st-century male musicians
Spanish male musicians